Ballinlough is a village in western County Roscommon, Ireland. The N60 national secondary road passes through it. The village is between Ballyhaunis and Castlerea on the Roscommon to Castlebar road. As of the 2016 census, Ballinlough had a population of 300 people.

Lake O'Flynn, which lies north of the village, is notable for brown trout fishing. The lake is also the source of the River Suck (which is a tributary of the River Shannon). In 2013, a bog walk was constructed around Lake O'Flynn, together with an outdoor gym.

Notable people
 Andreas O'Reilly von Ballinlough (1742–1832), a military commander in the service of the Austrian Empire, was born in the village.

See also
 List of towns and villages in Ireland

References

Towns and villages in County Roscommon
Conmaicne Sléibe Formaile